The Copan stream frog (Ptychohyla hypomykter)  is a species of frogs in the family Hylidae found in Guatemala, Honduras, Nicaragua, and possibly El Salvador. Its natural habitats are subtropical or tropical moist lowland forests, subtropical or tropical moist montane forests, rivers, pastureland, and heavily degraded former forests.
It is threatened by habitat loss.

References

Ptychohyla
Frogs of North America
Amphibians of Guatemala
Amphibians of Honduras
Amphibians of Nicaragua
Least concern biota of North America
Amphibians described in 1993
Taxonomy articles created by Polbot